Padre nuestro is a 1985 Spanish drama film directed by Francisco Regueiro. It was screened in the Un Certain Regard section at the 1985 Cannes Film Festival.

Cast
 Victoria Abril - Cardenala
 Rafaela Aparicio
 Luis Barbero
 Lina Canalejas
 Yolanda Cardama
 Diana Peñalver
 Emma Penella - María
 Francisco Rabal - Abel
 Fernando Rey - Cardinal
 Amelia de la Torre
 Francisco Vidal
 José Vivó

References

External links

1985 films
1980s Spanish-language films
1985 drama films
Films directed by Francisco Regueiro
Spanish drama films
1980s Spanish films